Ernolatia is a genus of moths of the family Bombycidae. The genus was erected by Francis Walker in 1862.

Species
Ernolatia lida (Moore, 1858)

Ernolatia moorei (Hutton, 1865)

References

Bombycidae